Zelda Harris (born February 17, 1985) is an American actress.

Harris was born in New York City to Karen and Philip Harris. She has a sister, Kenya. She attended Princeton University, where she was a member of the Class of 2007.

She began acting at age three.
Harris beat out more than one thousand other children for the role of Troy Carmichael in Spike Lee's Crooklyn, the role for which she is best known. She also played Jessi Ramsay in The Baby Sitters Club film.

Subsequent to her acting work, Harris was a singer with Zelda and the Lo Los. As of 2021, she is working as a teacher.

Filmography

Film

Television

References

External links

1985 births
Actresses from New York City
American child actresses
American television actresses
Living people
African-American actresses
American film actresses
21st-century African-American people
21st-century African-American women
20th-century African-American people
20th-century African-American women